CFT may refer to:

Chemistry
(-)-2β-Carbomethoxy-3β-(4-fluorophenyl)tropane
Cefatrizine, a cephalosporin antibiotic
Crystal field theory, describes the breaking of degeneracies of electron orbital states

Mathematics and physics
 Class field theory, a branch of algebraic number theory
 Classical field theory, electromagnetism and gravitation
 Conformal field theory, a quantum field theory that is invariant under conformal transformations
 Continuous Fourier transform

Military
 Cadet Field Training, part of United States Military Academy#Cadet life
 Combat Fitness Test, a British Army test of a soldier's lower and upper body strength, the Annual Fitness Test
 Combat Fitness Test, a US Marine Corps test that assesses the Marine's field readiness
 Contract Field Teams, a United States Air Force  designed to supplement maintenance of military assets
 , part of the Free French forces during World War II 
 United States Army Futures Command's CFTs, each a team of teams, led by a requirements leader, program manager, sustainer, tester
 Secretary of Defense-Empowered Cross-Functional Teams, specialized organizations within the DOD designed to assist it in addressing complex, cross-cutting problems and facilitating reforms

Transport
 Crofton Park railway station, in London, England (National Rail station code)
 Greenlee County Airport, in Clifton, Arizona, United States (FAA code)

Others

 Chichester Festival Theatre

 Combating the Financing of Terrorism, related to Anti-money laundering
 Comhairle Fo-Thuinn, the national body in Ireland for recreational diving and underwater sports
 Compassion-focused therapy, a system of psychotherapy developed by Paul Gilbert
 Confédération française du travail (National Confederation of Labour), former name of the Confédération des syndicats libres a French right-wing union dissolved in 2002
 Conformal fuel tanks, additional fuel tanks fitted to an aircraft
 Cross File Transfer, a secure computer file transfer program
 Cross-functional team, a group of people with different expertise working toward a common goal